The Ghost of Shockabilly is a compilation album by Shockabilly, released in 1989 by Shimmy Disc. It comprises 1983's Earth vs. Shockabilly and 1984's Colosseum, both originally released by Rough Trade Records.

Track listing

Release history

References

External links 
 

1989 compilation albums
Shockabilly albums
Albums produced by Kramer (musician)
Shimmy Disc compilation albums